The  is an automated guideway transit (AGT) vehicle used for passenger service on the Port Island Line (Port Liner) of the Kobe New Transit. The trains were introduced on February 2, 2006 to coincide with the extension of the Port Island Line to the newly opened Kobe Airport. The series is a successor to the 8000 series trains that has run on Port Liner since the line's opening in 1981.

Background 
Introduced on February 2, 2006, simultaneously with the extension of the Port Liner to Kobe Airport, the 2000 series is based on the Kawasaki Computer Control Vehicle (KCV) developed by Kawasaki Heavy Industries, the same company that manufactures the 8000 series rolling stock used for the Port Liner since service began. Therefore, it has guide wheels for floating switches installed on both sides of the cars. 2000 series and 8000 series are the only New Transit System rolling stock to handle this type. Since the last of the ageing 8000 series trains were withdrawn in 2009, additional 2000 series rolling stock may be manufactured in the future. Formation numbers are 13 through 15.

Physical design 
The exterior of the 2000 series is different from the 8000 series with the unpainted stainless steel body wrapped by lines in the corporate colors, green and blue. The logo mark next to the doors on the 8000 series is not present. The carriage has been changed to the same core-type pneumatic rubber tires used on the 1000 series. The interior is also different from the 8000 series with warm-colored box seats in a 2+1 arrangement. It is also equipped with overhead baggage racks and blinds. As in the 8000 series there is piping on the ceiling above the entry/exit doors to substitute for hand straps, but its shape is different. The communications device has been changed to intercom-form.

Barrier-free (accessibility) conversion 
Manufactured in accordance with the Transportation Accessibility Law, the 2000 series has from its beginning had wheelchair spaces and over-door LED information displays to indicate on which side the doors will open with multi-lingual support. 8000 series rolling stock was remodeled to include these features also. The intercom and emergency stop button were also moved close to the wheelchair space and their height adjusted to be usable from a wheelchair. Car body interior space was enlarged (by removing the baggage areas found in the 8000 series), and the elevation difference between platform and entry/exit doors reduced.

References

External links 

 Washington University: History Review
 Kobe PRT History
 New Kobe Transit Co., LTD (Japanese)
 New Kobe Transit Co., LTD (English)
 Washington University: Automated Guided Transit

Electric multiple units of Japan
Kobe New Transit
Train-related introductions in 2006
Kawasaki multiple units